Courts of New Mexico include:
;State courts of New Mexico
New Mexico Supreme Court
New Mexico Court of Appeals
New Mexico District Court (13 judicial districts)
New Mexico Magistrate Court
Bernalillo County Metropolitan Court
New Mexico Municipal Court
New Mexico Probate Court

Federal courts located in New Mexico
United States District Court for the District of New Mexico

References

External links
National Center for State Courts – directory of state court websites.

New Mexico state courts
Courts in the United States